Néstor Alejandro Araujo Razo (born 29 August 1991) is a Mexican professional footballer who plays as a centre-back for Liga MX club América and the Mexico national team. He is an Olympic gold medalist.

Araujo began his career with Cruz Azul in 2010, and played with the club for three years before joining Santos Laguna, initially in a loan deal which the club made permanent the following year. At Santos, he played in over 100 matches, winning the Liga MX on two occasions.

He competed internationally since 2011: Araujo played at the 2011 Copa America, 2012 Toulon Tournament, Copa America Centenario, and the 2017 FIFA Confederations Cup. He was on the Mexico team at the 2012 Summer Olympics that brought home the gold medal.

Club career

Cruz Azul
Araujo joined Cruz Azul's youth academy in 2007, making his way through the Cruz Azul Premier team and the under-20s.

In 2010, Enrique Meza promoted Araujo to the first team. On 19 September, Araujo made his Primera División debut for Cruz Azul, playing 90 minutes in the 3–0 home victory against Querétaro.

Santos Laguna

On 5 June 2013, Araujo joined Santos Laguna on a year-long loan deal with an option to buy. He made his league debut on 26 July against his former club Cruz Azul, playing the entire match as Santos earned a 3–2 victory. On 19 August 2014, Araujo scored his first goal for Santos in a 3–0 win over UAT in the Copa MX. He won his first cup with Santos Laguna following their victory over Puebla in the final of the Apertura Copa MX. The following year, Araujo won his first league title as Santos defeated Querétaro in the finals of the Clausura tournament. On 20 July, Santos defeated Club América to win the 2015 Campeón de Campeones cup; Araujo started the match and played all 90 minutes.

In May 2018, Santos Laguna defeated Toluca to win the Clausura tournament following a 3–2 aggregate score in the finals. Araujo missed the finals due to an injury he suffered while on international duty with the Mexico national team.

Celta de Vigo
On 14 June 2018, Araujo joined Spanish club Celta de Vigo on a five-year contract. On 21 July, he made his debut in a friendly match against Espanyol.

América
On 24 June 2022, Araujo returned to Mexico and joined Club América on permanent basis.

International career
Araujo received his first international call up in 2011 during the 2011 Copa America. In his international debut, he scored in a 2–1 loss against Chile during their first group stage match. He would go on to appear in the rest of the group stage matches and Mexico would end up last in the group.

Araujo would be an international regular under Juan Carlos Osorio, participating in various friendlies, the CONCACAF 2018 FIFA World Cup qualifiers, the Copa America Centenario, and the 2017 FIFA Confederations Cup.

On 27 March 2018, during a friendly match against Croatia, Araujo was forced off the pitch after 15 minutes when suffering an knee injury. He was sidelined since then, however in May he was named in Mexico's preliminary 28-man squad for the World Cup in Russia but had to withdraw due to experiencing tendonitis during his recovery.

Araujo was part of the squad that won the 2019 CONCACAF Gold Cup.

In October 2022, Araujo was named in Mexico's preliminary 31-man squad for the 2022 FIFA World Cup, and in November, he was ultimately included in the final 26-man roster.

Personal life
Araujo has an older brother, Félix, who is also a professional footballer.

Career statistics

Club

International

Scores and results list Mexico's goal tally first, score column indicates score after each Araujo goal.

Honours
Cruz Azul
Copa MX: Clausura 2013

Santos Laguna
Liga MX: Clausura 2015, Clausura 2018
Copa MX: Apertura 2014
Campeón de Campeones: 2015

Mexico U20
CONCACAF U-20 Championship: 2011

Mexico U23
Pan American Games: 2011
Toulon Tournament: 2012
CONCACAF Olympic Qualifying Championship: 2012
Olympic Gold Medal: 2012

Mexico
CONCACAF Gold Cup: 2019

Individual
Liga MX Best XI: Clausura 2017
Liga MX Best Defender: 2016–17
CONCACAF Nations League Finals Best XI: 2021

References

External links
 
 
 Néstor Araujo at ESPN Deportes 
 
 
 

1991 births
Living people
Mexico under-20 international footballers
Mexico international footballers
Cruz Azul footballers
Santos Laguna footballers
Club América footballers
RC Celta de Vigo players
Footballers at the 2011 Pan American Games
Liga MX players
La Liga players
2011 Copa América players
Copa América Centenario players
Footballers from Guadalajara, Jalisco
Olympic footballers of Mexico
Footballers at the 2012 Summer Olympics
Olympic gold medalists for Mexico
Olympic medalists in football
Mexico youth international footballers
Medalists at the 2012 Summer Olympics
Pan American Games gold medalists for Mexico
Association football defenders
Pan American Games medalists in football
2017 FIFA Confederations Cup players
Mexican footballers
Mexican expatriate footballers
Expatriate footballers in Spain
2019 CONCACAF Gold Cup players
CONCACAF Gold Cup-winning players
2021 CONCACAF Gold Cup players
Medalists at the 2011 Pan American Games
2022 FIFA World Cup players